Andri Eleftheriou (born 19 June 1984) is a Cypriot sport shooter, and a member of the women's national shooting team of Cyprus.

Eleftheriou was born in Limassol. In 2006, she won the skeet shooting gold medal at the Melbourne Commonwealth Games. She has also won silver at the 2006 ISSF World Cup in Germany, gold at the 2007 World Cup in Belgrade, Gold at the 2008 World Cup final in Minsk, and placed seventh in the 2008 Olympic Games in Beijing. She won a bronze medal at the 2014 Commonwealth Games in the skeet event and a gold medal at the 2018 Commonwealth Games in the skeet event. She is openly lesbian.

References

External links

1984 births
Living people
Sportspeople from Limassol
Cypriot female sport shooters
Skeet shooters
Olympic shooters of Cyprus
Shooters at the 2008 Summer Olympics
Shooters at the 2016 Summer Olympics
Commonwealth Games gold medallists for Cyprus
Commonwealth Games silver medallists for Cyprus
Shooters at the 2006 Commonwealth Games
Shooters at the 2014 Commonwealth Games
Shooters at the 2018 Commonwealth Games
Shooters at the 2015 European Games
European Games silver medalists for Cyprus
European Games medalists in shooting
Commonwealth Games medallists in shooting
Shooters at the 2019 European Games
Lesbian sportswomen
Commonwealth Games bronze medallists for Cyprus
Shooters at the 2020 Summer Olympics
Cypriot LGBT people
21st-century LGBT people
Medallists at the 2006 Commonwealth Games
Medallists at the 2014 Commonwealth Games
Medallists at the 2018 Commonwealth Games